Arthroleptis tuberosus is a species of frog in the family Arthroleptidae. It is found in Cameroon, Gabon, Republic of the Congo, and eastern Democratic Republic of the Congo, possibly Central African Republic.
Its natural habitats are montane and (presumably) lowland forests. It is threatened by habitat loss for agriculture and logging but is protected by the Virunga National Park and possibly other protected areas.

References

tuberosus
Frogs of Africa
Amphibians of Cameroon
Amphibians of the Democratic Republic of the Congo
Amphibians of Gabon
Amphibians of the Republic of the Congo
Amphibians described in 1905
Taxa named by Lars Gabriel Andersson
Taxonomy articles created by Polbot